HMS Ulysses was a Royal Navy modified R-class destroyer constructed and then operational in the First World War.

The destroyer was built by William Doxford & Sons in Sunderland and launched 24 March 1917. The vessel was sunk following a collision on 29 October 1918 with the SS Ellerie in the Firth of Clyde. However she sank without loss of life, although due to wartime security restrictions her sinking position is unknown. It is stated that the collision occurred in fog.

References

Citations

Bibliography 

 

World War I destroyers of the United Kingdom
R-class destroyers (1916)
1917 ships
Ships built on the River Wear